The Great Collapse is the fourth studio album by American deathcore band Fit for an Autopsy. The album was released March 17, 2017 through eOne Music and was produced by the band's guitarist Will Putney.

Track listing

Personnel 
Credits adapted from album's liner notes.

Fit for an Autopsy
 Joe Badolato – lead vocals
 Pat Sheridan – guitars, backing vocals
 Will Putney – guitars, bass, production, engineering, mixing, mastering
 Tim Howley – guitars
 Josean Orta – drums

Additional musicians
 Kevin McCaughey of Ion Dissonance – guest vocals on "Iron Moon"

Additional personnel
 Steve Seid – engineering, editing
 Jason Inguagiato – assistant
 Adam Burke – artwork

Charts

References

External links 
 

2017 albums
Fit for an Autopsy albums